Titagarh Wagons Limited is an Indian private shipbuilder, defense, railway wagon manufacturer headquartered in Kolkata, West Bengal. The company manufactures coaches for the Indian Railways, bailey bridges, and mining equipment.

A subsidiary, Titagarh Marines, operates in the shipbuilding industry. Titagarh possesses a Defence Industrial licence allowing them to manufacture defence products such as mine clearing systems, military trailers, CBRNe equipment, armouring solutions as well as naval vessels and warships.

History 
Titagarh Wagons' founder Jagadish Prasad Chowdhary began his career working as an account assistant at the Silcoorie tea estate in Darjeeling, West Bengal. He later moved to Calcutta (now Kolkata) to work as an accountant for Bhartia Electric Steel Co. (BESCO), a steel casting company, that supplied the Indian Railways. Chowdhary rose within the ranks of the company to eventually become chief executive officer of BESCO. In 1982, Chowdhary purchased the closed foundry division of state-owned Britania Engineering, located at Titagarh. He renamed the business as Titagarh Steels and began manufacturing railway castings such as bogies and couplers. Chowdhary purchased Titagarh Paper through the Board for Industrial and Financial Reconstruction (BIFR) in 1994. However, the operation was a failure and was shut down after the government abolished import duties on paper rendering the company's business unsustainable. Meanwhile, Titagarh Steels began producing crossing components for railways.

Chowdhary founded Titagarh Wagons Limited on 3 July 1997 to manufacture railway wagons. The company started out with an annual production capacity of 180 wagons.

In 2015, Titagarh Wagons acquired the brand name and know-how of French cast steel bogie manufacturer Sambre et Meuse. On 16 July 2015, Titagarh acquired a 90% stake in Italian rail equipment firm Firema Trasporti for an estimated  million. The remaining 10% stake was held by Italian company Adler Plastics SpA. In June 2017, Titagarh announced that it had acquired the 10% stake from Adler Plastics for an undisclosed amount. The company was subsequently renamed as Titagarh Firema SpA. Titagarh Firema designs metro rail coaches and manufactures them at its factories at Caserta, Spello and Tito.

In 2019, Titagarh Firema was awarded the contract to supply 102 aluminium bodied metro rail coaches for the Pune Metro by Maha Metro. While 3 of the total 34 rakes would be manufactured at the Firema plant in Italy, the remaining 31 trainsets would be manufactured at TWL's facility in Uttarpara. In March 2020, it was reported that Titagarh had suspended plan operations in Italy due to the COVID-19 pandemic.

Subsidiaries
 Cimmco Limited (India)
 Titagarh Firema SpA (Italy)

Titagarh Marine 
The company acquired Kolkata-based Corporated Shipyard in 2012, merging it with its subsidiary Titagarh Marines to manufacture ships for the Indian Navy, and won its first defence contract in 2017.

Matiere Titagarh Bridges 
Titagarh Wagons established a 50:50 joint venture with French company Matiere SAS called Matiere Titagarh Bridges Private Ltd (MTBPL) to manufacture metallic and modular bridges in May 2016. Titagarh acquired Matiere's stake in the joint venture in July 2020, making MTBPL a wholly-owned subsidiary of Titagarh.

Former subsidiaries

Arbel Fauvet Rail 

Titagarh Wagons made its first overseas acquisition in July 2010 by purchasing French rail wagon maker IGF Industries-Arbel Fauvet Rail (AFR) for EUR 15 million, which had gone into receivership in February 2009. A French commercial court ordered the liquidation of AFR in July 2019. The next month, Titagarh announced that it would exit from AFR. Vice-Chairman and Managing Director, Umesh Chowdhary, stated that AFR had been making losses of 4-5 million euros a year for the past three years due to general economic factors, and would have required more capital to reach profitability. Titagarh Wagons had invested  in AFR since acquiring the company.

Products and services

Railway freight 

 Rolling stock
 Components
 Bogies
 Couplers
 Locomotive shells
 Gears

Railway transit 

 Rolling stock
 Electric locomotives
 EMU trainsets
 DEMU trainsets
 Metros
 Light rail transports
 Body shells
 Bogies 
 Propulsion & electrical equipment

Shipbuilding 

 Coastal research vessels
 Naval vessels
 Passenger ships
 Tugs
 Inland vessels

Other engineering services 

 Bailey bridges
 Defence

See also 
 Diesel Locomotive Factory, Marhowrah
 Electric Locomotive Factory, Madhepura
 Chittaranjan Locomotive Works, Asansol
 Banaras Locomotive Works, Varanasi
 Integral Coach Factory, Chennai
 Modern Coach Factory, Raebareli
 Rail Coach Factory, Kapurthala
 Rail Wheel Plant, Bela
 Rail Wheel Factory, Yelahanka

References

External links 
 

Coach and wagon manufacturers of India
Companies based in Kolkata
Indian companies established in 1997
Shipbuilding companies of India
Vehicle manufacturing companies established in 1997
1997 establishments in West Bengal
Companies listed on the National Stock Exchange of India
Companies listed on the Bombay Stock Exchange
Freight wagons manufacturers